Dare is an unincorporated community in York County, Virginia, United States, on the Virginia Peninsula.

External links 
York County Virginia Local Government

Unincorporated communities in York County, Virginia
Unincorporated communities in Virginia